Microstomatichthyoborus is a genus of distichodontid fishes endemic to the Democratic Republic of Congo.  The currently described species in this genus are:
 Microstomatichthyoborus bashforddeani Nichols & Griscom, 1917
 Microstomatichthyoborus katangae L. R. David & Poll, 1937

References
 

Distichodontidae
Fish of Africa
Taxa named by John Treadwell Nichols
Taxa named by Ludlow Griscom
Endemic fauna of the Democratic Republic of the Congo